Hylaeus confusus  is a Palearctic species of  solitary bee. It is known to nest in reed stalk galls.

References

External links
Images representing Hylaeus confusus  

Hymenoptera of Europe
Colletidae
Insects described in 1852